Zapponeta is a town and comune in the province of Foggia in the Apulia region of southeast Italy. Until 1975 it was a frazione of Manfredonia. It was founded in 1768 by baron Michele Zezza.

References

Cities and towns in Apulia
Populated places established in 1768
1768 establishments in Italy